The Montreal Barbarians Rugby Club is Rugby Quebec's second oldest member currently fielding one men's team and two women's divisions. The league, established in 1953, offers an opportunity for rugby players of all abilities to participate against opposition of equal ability.

External links
Montreal Barbarians Home Page

Bar